Nigel Clark (born 25 March 1956) is a British modern pentathlete. He competed at the 1980 Summer Olympics where he finished 8th in the team event and 33nd in the individual event.

References

External links
 

1956 births
Living people
British male modern pentathletes
Olympic modern pentathletes of Great Britain
Modern pentathletes at the 1980 Summer Olympics